DCPG ((S)-3,4-DCPG) is a drug used in scientific research, which acts as a potent and subtype-selective agonist for the metabotropic glutamate receptor mGluR8. It has anticonvulsant effects in animal studies, and has also been investigated as a possible treatment for hyperalgesia.

References 

Anticonvulsants
Amino acid derivatives
Tricarboxylic acids
MGlu8 receptor agonists